François Bizot (born 8 February 1940) is a French anthropologist, the only Westerner to have survived imprisonment by the Khmer Rouge.

Arrival in Cambodia

Bizot arrived in Cambodia in 1965 to study Buddhism practised in the countryside. He travelled extensively around Cambodia, researching the history and customs of its dominant religion. He speaks fluent Khmer, French and English and was married to a Cambodian with whom he had a daughter, Hélène, in 1968. When the Vietnam War spilled into Cambodia, Bizot was employed at the Angkor Conservation Office, restoring ceramics and bronzes.

Bizot, at first, welcomed the American intervention in Cambodia, hoping that they might counter the rising influence of the Communists.  "But their irresponsibility, the inexcusable naivete, even their cynicism, frequently aroused more fury and outrage in me than did the lies of the Communists. Throughout those years of war, as I frantically scoured the hinterland for the old manuscripts that the heads of monasteries had secreted in lacquered chests, I witnessed the Americans' imperviousness to the realities of Cambodia,"  wrote Bizot in his memoirs of the time.

Capture

In October 1971, Bizot and his two Cambodian colleagues were captured by the Khmer Rouge. During his captivity on charges of being a CIA agent at the Khmer Rouge Camp M.13 at Anlong Veng, he developed a strangely close relationship with his captor, Comrade Duch, who later became the Director of the infamous Tuol Sleng concentration camp in Phnom Penh. During his three-month imprisonment he came to understand the true genocidal nature of the Khmer Rouge long before other outsiders. He was finally released in December 1971 after Comrade Duch wrote a detailed report that convinced the Khmer Rouge leadership of Bizot's innocence. Bizot's Cambodian colleagues were executed soon after Bizot's release.

Life after captivity
When the Khmer Rouge captured Phnom Penh on 17 April 1975, Bizot, like most other foreigners in the country, sought refuge in the French Embassy. Because of his fluency in Khmer, he soon became the primary point of contact and unofficial translator between the embassy officials and the Khmer Rouge. He left Cambodia when the Khmer Rouge expelled all foreigners and sealed off Cambodia's borders. He returned to Cambodia in 2003 and met his former captor Duch, who was waiting for his trial for crimes against humanity, for about one hour and a half (a few minutes of the encounter were put on film). These moments can be seen in the documentary "Derrière Le Portail" ("Behind The Gate"). Duch was on trial at the Extraordinary Chambers in the Courts of Cambodia and received a 35-year sentence, later increased to life from an appeal.  Bizot was the first witness to testify at the trial.

Bizot is Emeritus Professor at the École française d'Extrême-Orient.

In popular culture

Bizot's story provides the basis for the character Hansen in John le Carré’s novel The Secret Pilgrim.

See also 

 Malcolm Caldwell
 Vann Nath
 Chum Mey
 Sean Flynn
 Dana Stone
 Stuart Robert Glass
 François Ponchaud

Further reading
François Bizot. 2003. The Gate. New York: Alfred A. Knopf. Euan Cameron, trans.
François Bizot. 2006. Le Saut du Varan.  Paris: Flammarion
François Bizot. 2012. Facing the Torturer.  New York: Alfred A. Knopf.  Charlotte Mandell and Antoine Audouard, trans.

References

External links

 Bizot's web page at the EFEO
 A Survivor's Story:  interview on the Connection. WBUR. Show Originally Aired: April 11, 2003.

French anthropologists
French ethnologists
1940 births
Living people
Writers from Nancy, France
Prix des Deux Magots winners
Cambodian genocide survivors
French expatriates in Cambodia